Pandan is a town in North Sumatra province of Indonesia and it is the seat (capital) of Central Tapanuli Regency.

Climate
Pandan has a tropical rainforest climate (Af) with heavy to very heavy rainfall year-round.

Populated places in North Sumatra
Regency seats of North Sumatra